1168 Brandia, provisional designation , is a stony Eunomian asteroid from the central regions of the asteroid belt, approximately 10 kilometers in diameter. Discovered by astronomer Eugène Delporte at Uccle Observatory in 1930, the asteroid was later named after mathematician Eugène Brand.

Discovery 

Brandia was discovered on 25 August 1930, by astronomer Eugène Delporte at the Royal Observatory of Belgium in Uccle. Six nights later, the asteroid was independently discovered by Soviet astronomer Grigory Neujmin at Simeiz Observatory on 31 August 1930. The Minor Planet Center, however, only recognizes the first discoverer. The body's observation arc begins at Uccle, two nights after its official discovery observation.

Orbit and classification 

This asteroid is a member of the Eunomia family, a prominent family of stony asteroids and the largest one in the intermediate main belt with more than 5,000 members.

Brandia  orbits the Sun in the central main-belt at a distance of 2.0–3.1 AU once every 4 years and 1 month (1,488 days). Its orbit has an eccentricity of 0.22 and an inclination of 13° with respect to the ecliptic.

Physical characteristics 

Brandia is an assumed S-type asteroid, which corresponds to the overall spectral type of the Eunomia family.

Rotation period 

In September 1989, a rotational lightcurve of Brandia was obtained from photometric observations by American astronomer Richard Binzel at CTIO and McDonald Observatory. Lightcurve analysis gave a well-defined rotation period of hours with a relatively high brightness variation of 0.62 magnitude.

An identical period of 11.444 hours with an amplitude of 0.50 magnitude was measured with a Celestron 14-inch telescope by Frederick Pilcher and published in 1985.

Diameter and albedo 

According to the surveys carried out by the Infrared Astronomical Satellite IRAS and the NEOWISE mission of NASA's Wide-field Infrared Survey Explorer, Brandia measures 10.110 and 10.61 kilometers in diameter, and its surface has an albedo of 0.150 and 0.1526, respectively.

The Collaborative Asteroid Lightcurve Link derives an albedo of 0.1375 and a diameter of 10.58 kilometers based on an absolute magnitude of 12.65.

Naming 

This minor planet was named after Belgian mathematician Eugène Brand, professor at the University of Brussels in  Belgium. The official naming citation was mentioned in The Names of the Minor Planets by Paul Herget in 1955.

References

External links 
 Asteroid Lightcurve Database (LCDB), query form (info )
 Dictionary of Minor Planet Names, Google books
 Asteroids and comets rotation curves, CdR – Observatoire de Genève, Raoul Behrend
 Discovery Circumstances: Numbered Minor Planets (1)-(5000) – Minor Planet Center
 
 

001168
Discoveries by Eugène Joseph Delporte
Named minor planets
19300825